, 16 video games focused on the Fort Boyard series have been released. The following table showcases the correspondent title, release date, publisher, developer and the platforms on which each game was released along with any other relevant information.

Notes

References

1995 video games
Android (operating system) games
DOS games
DOS-only games
Game Boy Color games
Game Boy Color-only games
IOS games
Média-Participations franchises
Microïds games
Fort Boyard
Fort Boyard
Video games scored by Allister Brimble
Video games developed in France
Windows games
Windows-only games